Acalolepta nivosa is a species of beetle in the family Cerambycidae. It was described by Adam White in 1858. It is known from India, Sri Lanka, Nepal, and Myanmar. It feeds on Calotropis gigantea.

References

Acalolepta
Beetles described in 1858